Turtulli is a surname. Notable people with the surname include:

Marvin Turtulli (born 1994), Albanian professional footballer 
Mihal Turtulli (1847–1935), Albanian oculist and politician